U Live was the flagship show of TVNZ U, airing live from 4pm - 7pm daily. The show featured music, interviews, and other general interest content. Viewers were invited to participate via Facebook to vote in psychic readings, take part in discussions, and view the show via a live commercial- and graphic-free stream, where comments and psychic readings would then be played live. U Live was hosted by Connor Nestor, Matthew Gibb, Kirsteen Mackenzie, Eli Matthewson and Monika Barton. U Live drew many parallels to TVNZ's rival network Mediaworks' youth-oriented show FOUR Live, which aired on FOUR.

Presenters

Final Presenters
 Connor Nestor ( - )
 Matthew Gibb ( - )
 Kirsteen Mackenzie ( - ) 
 Eli Matthewson ( - )
 Monika Barton ( - )

Previous Presenters
 Tim Lambourne ( - )
 Guy Montgomery (Fill In Host, 2011)
 Tom Furniss (Fill In Host, 2012)
 Rose Matafeo ( - )

U Live Facebook App
TVNZ teamed up with Facebook to create an application that would allow for user-generated content to be provided and presented on the show, in the form of polls, discussions and music video requests.

External links
TVNZ U website
TVNZ U launch announcement regarding Facebook application
TVNZ U Facebook Page
TVNZ U Facebook Application

References

2011 New Zealand television series debuts
U (TV channel) original programming
2013 New Zealand television series endings